S. Nagarathinam was elected to the Tamil Nadu Legislative Assembly from the Krishnarayapuram constituency in the 1996 elections. The constituency was reserved for candidates from the Scheduled Castes. He was a candidate of the Dravida Munnetra Kazhagam (DMK) party.

References 

Tamil Nadu MLAs 1996–2001
Dravida Munnetra Kazhagam politicians
Possibly living people
Year of birth missing